Craig Phillips (born 16 October 1971) is an English television personality and builder. He is known for winning the first series of Big Brother in 2000. He is trained as a bricklayer, and has appeared in numerous television series related to building since winning Big Brother.

Early life 
The younger of two children and born in Liverpool, his family moved to Newport, Shropshire in the late 1980s. At 18, Phillips secured a day release bricklayers apprenticeship whilst employed with Wrekin Council's construction department. He also attended further night school classes in advanced brickwork and civil engineering. Having qualified with a City & Guilds, Phillips went on to set up his own building company. In the 1990s, he presented Renovation Street with Linda Robson for Carlton ITV before being brought in as the DIY expert for the BBC on an exclusive contract in 2001.

Career after Big Brother
After leaving Big Brother as the first winner, Phillips announced he was giving his £70,000 prize fund to his friend Joanne Harris, who had Down syndrome, to pay for her heart and lung transplant. He had begun raising money with friends for Harris sometime before entering Big Brother, raising only small amounts of money towards the £250,000 needed for her operation, but within 6 days of winning, he achieved the target required for her life saving operation thanks to public support and donations from celebrities. Harris died in April 2008. He has featured in comedy series Bo' Selecta! and appeared in the reality series Back To Reality, raising £40,000 for Macmillan Cancer Trust.

At Christmas 2000, Phillips released the charity single, "At This Time of Year" through Warner Music. The single went to Number 14 in the UK Singles Chart, achieving silver disc status, and raising over £40,000 for the Down's Syndrome Association. It stayed in the top 40 for three weeks. Since then, he appeared in videos for two other Xmas singles – "Bo Selectas! Proper Crimbo" which reached No. 4 in 2003 and Ricky Tomlinson's "Xmas My A*se" which reached 25 in 2006. In 2001, Phillips appeared on Lily Savage's Blankety Blank; in 2003, Phillips appeared on the fifth series of Fort Boyard. 

Phillips has presented numerous televisions programmes, including Housecall, Housecall in the Country, Builders Sweat and Tears, Our House, Trading Up, Big Strong Boys, Boyz in the Wood, Big Strong Boys in the Sun, Renovation Street, Trading Up in the Sun, House Trap and Craig’s Trade Tips. He also has a production company called Avent Productions. For Avent, he has presented Conversion; a 10-part series for Discovery Realtime, and the sixth series of Hung, Drawn & Broke, a 6-part series filmed for British Forces Broadcasting Service. The company also produces corporate productions many of these for building companies. In 2007, Phillips joined the team of 60 Minute Makeover for ITV. He appeared in 80 episodes in 2008. 

In February 2009, Phillips appeared in Ant & Dec's Saturday Night Takeaway in "Escape from Takeaway Prison" for six weeks. In summer 2009, he released his debut autobiography. In July 2009, Phillips returned to the Big Brother house to help celebrate the show's tenth anniversary. In 2010, Phillips appeared on Big Brother again, and competed in a shed building task. He also appeared in Dermot's Last Supper, a special to celebrate the ending of Big Brother. In April 2011, he hosted a show called Celebrity DIY with Craig Phillips for Home. In June 2011, he also hosted If It's Broke, Fit It for Home.

In June 2020, he made a guest appearance on Big Brothers's Best Shows on E4, where he talked about watching his series back.

Since 2013, Phillips has worked as a presenter for the SilverLine Tools YouTube channel, demonstrating how to put together and build some of their products. He is also often featured in their website and social media.

Personal life
In 2018, Phillips married Laura Sherriff at Peckforton Castle, Cheshire, after the couple had dated for two years. Rather than asking for gifts from guests, he and Sherriff asked that the attendants donate to hospice charities instead. The couple have two children: Nelly (born March 2019), and Lennon (born December 2020). The couple featured in Channel 5's (S1 Ep1) "Millionaire Age Gap Love" in 2020.

References

External links
 

1971 births
Living people
Big Brother (British TV series) winners
People from Newport, Shropshire
Broadcast mass media people from Liverpool
British bricklayers